Melloconcha is a genus of six species of tiny glass-snails that are endemic to Australia's Lord Howe Island in the Tasman Sea.

Species
 Melloconcha delecta Iredale, 1944 – tiny amber glass-snail
 Melloconcha flavescens (Iredale, 1944) – tiny yellow glass-snail
 Melloconcha grata Iredale, 1944 – angulate glass-snail
 Melloconcha miranda (Iredale, 1944) – Miranda's glass-snail
 Melloconcha prensa Iredale, 1944 – flattened glass-snail
 Melloconcha rosacea (Iredale, 1944) – tiny rosy glass-snail

References

 
 

 
 
Gastropod genera
Taxa named by Tom Iredale
Gastropods described in 1944
Gastropods of Lord Howe Island